I-Testament is a studio album by reggae/dancehall artist Capleton. It was released in 1997 via Def Jam. The album contains guest appearances from Q-Tip, Sizzla, Big Youth, and  D.V. Alias Khrist.

It peaked at #3 on the Billboard Reggae Albums chart.

Critical reception
AllMusic wrote that the album "owes more to sinewy, seductive contemporary R&B rhythms influenced by ragga and dancehall than to reggae itself, but much of this music is solidly constructed." The Encyclopedia of Popular Music wrote that the album "saw Capleton at the peak of his powers."

Track listing

References

1997 albums
Capleton albums